Mersal is a 2017 Indian Tamil-language action thriller film directed by Atlee who co-wrote the film with V. Vijayendra Prasad and S. Ramana Girivasan. Produced by Thenandal Studio Limited in the studio's hundredth feature film production, the film stars Vijay and S. J. Suryah while Sathyaraj, Vadivelu, Nithya Menen, Kajal Aggarwal, Samantha Ruth Prabhu, Hareesh Peradi, Kovai Sarala and Sathyan appear in pivotal supporting roles. The story revolves around two brothers; one is a magician avenging his parents's  deaths and medical crimes, and the other, a reputed doctor who charges meagre amounts from his patients. 

The film's principal photography commenced on 1 February 2017, at Chennai and was completed that September, within 130 working days. Filming took place on Gdańsk, Poland and Jaisalmer, Rajasthan. The background score and soundtrack album were composed by A. R. Rahman, while the cinematography was done by G. K. Vishnu and edited by Ruben.

Mersal was released worldwide on 18 October 2017, coinciding with Diwali. The film received mostly positive response with critics praising the performance of Vijay and S. J. Suryah, A. R. Rahman's soundtrack, cinematography, social message and Atlee's direction, but criticised the cliched plot and excessive length. It is also a recipient of various accolades. The film was a commercial success, grossing  worldwide, becoming the highest grossing film in Vijay's career at that time as well as one of the highest-grossing Tamil films. The film completed 100-day theatrical run on 25 January 2018. The film was released on 6 December 2018 in China by HGC Entertainment. Due to demand, the film was screened at the largest cinema theatre in Europe Grand Rex, France. The film was screened at the Hainan International Film Festival in Hainan, China and at the Bucheon International Fantastic Film Festival in South Korea.

Plot 
An ambulance driver, medical broker, hospital worker and a surgeon are abducted at dawn, which is traced to Dr. Maaran, a doctor from Chennai, who is known for providing treatment to all at just . Maaran is arrested and interrogated by Inspector Ratnavel "Randy", who is assigned the case. Maaran explains that the four were responsible for the death of an auto driver's daughter and subsequent suicide of his wife due to their greed for money and negligence in providing proper healthcare. He gives Randy the locations of his hostages, but asserts that they can be saved only if they are taken in time to hospital just like the auto driver's daughter. Maaran reveals that he is not Maaran but his doppelgänger Vetri, a magician. 

Vetri was also responsible for the death of Arjun Zachariah, a corrupt doctor who was killed during a stage performance in Paris two years ago. Daniel Arokiaraj, another corrupt doctor and the head of the state's medical council, sees Maaran's inexpensive healthcare as a threat to his flourishing hospital business and decides to kill Maaran using his goons but is saved in the nick of time by Vetri, who knocks Maaran unconscious and swaps places with him, providing clues to the police which led to his arrest. Maaran is rescued, while Vetri, manages to escape from Randy. Later, Maaran confronts Vetri, believing him to be the cause of all his problems. Vadivu, Maaran's compounder, and also Vetri's assistant, intervenes and explains to Maaran why Vetri is targeting doctors indulging in corrupt medical practices. 

Past: Maaran and Vetri are the sons of Aishwarya "Aishu" and Vetrimaaran, an altruistic village wrestler and chieftain. Vetrimaaran decides to build a temple in his area and holds a large festive event. However, a fire breaks out, injuring many and killing two children due to lack of mobility. On the advice of Aishu, Vetrimaaran establishes a hospital in his village Manoor in Madurai with Daniel and Arjun as chief doctors, while Vetrimaaran manages the hospital. However, it soon turned out that Daniel and Arjun are money-minded misanthropists and performs a Caesarean section on Aishu, when she was in labour with her second child (Vetri) to extract more money from Vetrimaaran. With an overdose of anaesthesia and loss of blood, Aishu dies while the child was declared as stillborn. 

When Vetrimaaran learns about this, he confronts Daniel, but is attacked. Vetrimaaran fights the henchmen, but gets stabbed to death by Daniel's assistant Kasi, where Daniel reveals that he was the mastermind behind the fire accident in the temple so that Vetrimaaran could build a hospital for their business profits. After having killed Vetrimaaran, Daniel and Arjun embezzled money in medical service to consolidate their dictatorship over the years, while creating a massive genocide from beyond. 

However, Maaran is saved as Vetrimaaran has placed an unconscious Maaran (who had been struck on the head with a glass bottle) safely on a truck, but loses his memory and is unable to recollect anything that happened before passing out. Meanwhile, Vetri miraculously survives, and their paternal uncle (Vetrimaaran's younger brother) Vadivu takes care of him. Vetri and Vadivu are adopted by a famous magician Salim Ghosh, and Vetri soon learns all the magic tricks in order to exact vengeance. 

Present: Upon learning his past from Vadivu, Maaran reconciles with Vetri and decide to finish Daniel, where they swap places. With Vetri (who is actually Maaran) seemingly in custody, Daniel meets him in prison and contemplates on misusing the medical industry for his personal gains. Meanwhile, Daniel's nephew Sesha tries to make a deal with Maaran (who is actually Vetri) to shut down his practice. However, when they both learn the truth, Vetri slits Sesha's hand. Daniel rushes to Vetri's hideout. Vetri defeats all of Daniel's henchmen and injures Daniel with a glass bottle, but just then, Kasi crashes a bus into Vetri, making him faint. 

In the truck, Maaran also got involved in an accident orchestrated by Daniel, where he wakes Vetri up. As Vetri is injured, Maaran kills Kasi and also kills Daniel along with Vetri. Later, Vetri is arrested for his role in the murders of all six people killed and is sentenced to prison. Before leaving, Vetri gives a press conference justifying his actions by exposing corrupt medical practices and embezzlement of money in the field; he adds that his endeavors will continue until the whole system is reformed. In prison, Vetri watches a news report in which, despite his efforts, another young girl in Odisha had died from negligent medical treatment. On hearing this, Vetri escapes using his magic tricks and continues his mission. After this, Maaran has been conferred a statewide recognised medical counselor post.

Cast

Production

Development 
Following the release of Atlee's Theri, with Vijay in the lead, the pair was signed by Sri Thenandal Films for another project together in September 2016. Initially, reports were surfaced that Atlee will be directing Mahesh Babu after Theri, and was developing the script for the past seven months which did not happen; Similarly, Vijay too being signed for Sangamithra produced by Thenandal Films, but as the film demanded 250 days of the schedule which he could not afford, he politely declined the offer. It was reported that the film will begin production only after the release of Vijay's Bairavaa. In October 2016, Safwan Saleem, the chief executive officer of the production house, confirmed the project; and further announced that writer V. Vijayendra Prasad, who had earlier worked in films like the Baahubali series and Bajrangi Bhaijaan will be a part of the technical team.

The film featured Vijay playing triple role for the first time in his career, as a doctor, magician and a head of panchayat in the film. A report from Deccan Chronicle said that: "The actor’s comic timing will be brought on screen through the magician’s role. His portions are intended to evoke laughter and lighten up the mood." The report further denied claims that Vijay will play a Sikh in the film. Vijay learnt a few magic tricks in preparation for his role as the magician. He learnt the magic tricks from three magicians: Gogo Requiem from the Republic of Macedonia, Raman Sharma from Canada, and Dani Belev from Bulgaria.

Hema Rukmani, CEO of Sri Thenandal Films announced that the film would be the 100th production of the company, instead of Sangamithra; On 21 April 2017, the producers announced that the film would be launched under their newly renamed banner Thenandal Studio Limited and also announcing a release date of October 2017. At the first look launch of Sangamithra at the Cannes Film Festival, Hema Rukmani said that "Most people look at Vijay as a ‘mass actor.’ But, I’ve seen him perform and he's an outstanding actor. I’ve noticed a lot of things during shooting. His sense of continuity is brilliant. Whether the assistant director remembers or not, he will know. I had the great joy of watching him improvise and it is a treat." The production of the film began without announcing a title; on 21 June 2017, the makers announced the title as Mersal and also released the first look poster of the film.

Casting 
In December 2016, actresses Jyothika, Kajal Aggarwal and Samantha Ruth Prabhu were announced as the female leads for the film. However, the production team later revealed that Jyothika opted out of the film due to unavoidable reasons. and the role went to Nithya Menen in her first association with Vijay. In January 2017, A. R. Rahman was reported to compose the film's background score and soundtrack album, collaborating with Vijay after ten years since Azhagiya Thamizh Magan (2007). Actors S. J. Suryah and Sathyaraj also joined the cast as supporting actors, the former in a negative role with two looks in the film. Vadivelu who eventually wanted to act with Vijay in Theri, missed the role due to unavoidable reasons. He was later announced as a part of this project. Other comedians Kovai Sarala, Sathyan and Rajendran also joined the film.

Atlee's usual cinematographer George C. Williams whom worked for Raja Rani and Theri, was supposed to work in this film too, but failed due to date clashes with his other project. Later, newcomer G. K. Vishnu, an erstwhile assistant of Richard M. Nathan was signed on this project. The official cast and crew members working in the film, were announced by Thenandal Films in January 2017, with Anal Arasu as the action choreographer, Ruben who worked with Atlee in his previous projects were announced as the film's editor, T. Muthuraj as the film's production designer, Shobi and Prem Rakshith as dance choreographers, Neeraja Kona and Komal Shahani as the costume designers. During the film's production, Hareesh Peradi, Yogi Babu and Cheenu Mohan joined the film's cast.

Filming 

A launch event for the film was held at Adityaram Studios in Chennai on 1 February 2017 with production beginning thereafter. The shooting of the film took place at Panaiyur in East Coast Road, Chennai on the first day of the shoot, and went continuously for 20 days until 19 February. The team took a brief break after production and then started the second schedule in Chennai on 1 March 2017. On 15 March, one of the stills from the film unofficially released through the internet with Vijay in a twirled moustache and a dhoti, and went viral. Following the schedule's completion, the team headed to Rajasthan on 31 March, despite being reported that filming may take place in Europe, after the second schedule.

The team has decided to shoot with Vijay and Nithya Menen in Jaisalmer for a song (which was later titled as "Aalaporaan Thamizhan"), irrespective of the hot weather prevailing in the location. The steam engine named 7161WP AKBAR was used in this film while shooting in Rajasthan. An action sequence was also filmed at Rajasthan and within its completion, the team completed the Rajasthan schedule on 12 April 2017. Then, the team planned for a month-long schedule in Europe on 25 April, with Vijay, Kajal Aggarwal and other cast members being present. A song (titled "Maacho") and few action sequences were filmed at Poland (Gdańsk, Poznań and Rzeszów's airport), as well as filming being conducted in Skopje, Republic of Macedonia.

Following the shooting in Europe, the team returned to Chennai in June 2017 and began the intermediate schedule on 5 June 2017, with Samantha being present and was filmed subsequently at the location. In mid-July 2017, sources had reported that the team had planned to complete the entire shooting within 130 working days, so that the team would have enough time to work on the film's post-production. However, the film's shooting was affected following the indefinite strike announced by the Film Employees Federation of South India (FEFSI) on 1 August, and another strike on 1 September. After FEFSI withdrew the strike on 13 September, work on the film's production been resumed, with few scenes being shot at the Kathipara Junction in Chennai, leading to traffic congestion as the shoot went till 8:00 A.M. despite the officials gave permission to shoot till 6:00 A.M. Following a song shoot and patchwork sequences the principal photography was wrapped up.

Themes and influences 
The character Maaran (or  doctor), played by Vijay in the film, was inspired from Dr. Balasubramanian, a doctor who hails from Bodinayakkanur, Theni district, and charges  from patients. It is also known that Vijay's character Jeevanantham in Kaththi (2014), is inspired by a real-life social activist. Critics noted that the film has similarities related to MGR-starrers Kudiyirundha Koyil (1968) and Neerum Neruppum (1971), where he played dual roles, Rajinikanth-starrer Moondru Mugam (1982), and Kamal Haasan's Apoorva Sagodharargal (1989; Appu Raja in Hindi), which had the actors playing triple roles. Shyam Gowtham in his review for the magazine The Week has stated about the references of M. G. Ramachandran in the film saying "Vijay is doing what M. G. Ramachandran, did in the 1950s; the Dravida Munnetra Kazhagam in Tamil Nadu did what Joseph Goebbels did in Hitler’s Germany—use cinema to propagate its ideology. Thus, it changed the way films were made. There are four instances in the film where Vijay is compared with MGR—in fact, his introduction scene starts with an MGR song."

Music 

A. R. Rahman composed the soundtrack album and background score of Mersal, teaming up with Vijay for the third time, after his films Udhaya (2004), and Azhagiya Tamizh Magan (2007), and his first collaboration with Atlee. The lyrics for the film were written by Vivek, who also teams up with Rahman for the first time. It marked the first release of Vijay and Rahman in the silver jubilee year. The audio rights of the film were acquired by Sony Music India, for a record price. The tracks "Aalaporaan Thamizhan" and "Neethanae" were released as singles on 10 and 17 August 2017. The audio launch event was held on 20 August 2017, at Jawaharlal Nehru Indoor Stadium in Chennai, which was touted to be the "biggest Kollywood event of the year", and it saw the attendance of prominent celebrities from the Tamil film Industry being present at the event,  which also featured a live music performance by Rahman and his team. The album crossed 100 million streams, within 10 days, setting a streaming record for a Tamil album.

Marketing 
The first look posters released on 21 June 2017 became the highest retweeted first look in Twitter, close to 50,000 people. 

As an innovative approach, Hema Rukmani teamed up with ICONICbot, an Indo-Austrian Venture, powered by actor Vishakha Singh, to launch an artificial intelligence based chat-bot for the production house through Facebook Messenger. This is a first-of-a-kind initiative in the South Indian film industry, in which an artificial intelligence technology is used to connect with all movie goers personally, where chat-bots are used in Hindi  cinema by top stars for promoting their films. Hema Rukmani had stated that "though we share the information about the film through the official Twitter handle of the production house, there must be false news prevailing all around. So, we had planned for launching TSL chatbot where fans can share the relevant information with them exclusively."

The film is the first South-Indian film to get a Twitter emoji of its first look and also to trademark its title. Few sources from the production house stated that "if one uses the term Mersal for commercial purposes, a part of their revenue should be paid to the team as royalty". 

The teaser trailer of the film unveiled on 21 September 2017 (coinciding Atlee's birthday) and became the most-viewed Indian movie teaser with 34.6 million views, surpassing Kabali (2016) and Vivegam (2017), and became the first Indian movie teaser to get 1 million likes. 

Two TV spots were premiered during the television broadcast of Baahubali 2: The Conclusion (Tamil dubbed version) on 8 October 2017. 

Sources claimed that the innovative marketing strategies of the film contributed to the film's success. Exchange4Media, an advertising company commented that Mersal was one of the South Indian films that disrupted the digital marketing space.

Release

Theatrical 
Mersal was earlier scheduled for theatrical release on 29 September 2017, however as Shankar's 2.0 which was scheduled for release on Diwali (18 October 2017) got delayed due to extensive visual effects; the producers decided to release the film on that date. On 16 October 2017, the film received a U/A certificate from CBFC, with few cuts after getting NOC from AWBI.

The film opened on more than 3,300 screens worldwide which is highest for a Tamil film. In Malaysia, the film released on 800 screens, and more than 275 screens in Kerala. In Karnataka, the film was released in 100 screens, and in Andhra Pradesh, it accounted 400 screens. The film was later screened in PVR Cinemas and Inox Multiplex on 24 October 2017, following their strike against the double taxation row which held on 3 October. The film was re-released again in March 2018, following the producer council's strike against digital service providers over the increase of Virtual Print Fee charges.

Mersal was screened at Grand Rex, France, which is the largest cinema theatre in Europe, due to the high demand of the film. It was further released in Japan in four major cities Tokyo, Ebino, Osaka and Nakayama, which is the highest for a Tamil film. The film was released in China by HGC Entertainment on 6 December 2018, through 10,000 screens, which Mersal becomes the first Tamil film to be released in this country. The film was screened at the Hainan International Film Festival in Hainan, China in March 2019, and at the Bucheon International Fantastic Film Festival in Bucheon, South Korea at 29 July 2018.

Distribution 
North Star Entertainment along with SN Techs Film Distribution Company have secured the distribution rights for the film in Andhra Pradesh and Telangana; Global United Media has secured the distribution for the film in Kerala; Horizon Studios acquired the Karnataka rights; MKS Talkies has secured the distribution rights for the film in Australia and New Zealand, ATMUS Entertainment has secured the distribution rights for the film in United States.

Home media 
The television broadcast rights were sold to Zee Tamil for 30 crore in July 2017. The film had its global television premiere on 14 January 2018 on occasion of the Thai Pongal festival. The satellite rights of the Telugu and the Malayalam dubbed versions were acquired by Star Maa and Asianet respectively. Later, Udaya TV acquired the rights for the Kannada dubbed version of the film titled Maayagara and premiered it through their channel on 13 September 2020. It is available in digital streaming platforms through Netflix and ZEE5 (in Tamil), Sun NXT (in Kannada), and Hotstar (in Malayalam). The film's Hindi dubbed version was directly premiered on Dhinchaak TV channel (now renamed to Goldmines) on 13 March 2022.

Reception

Box office 
In the opening day of its release the film earned 31.3 crore in domestic region and 47.1 crore worldwide.

India 
At the Chennai city box office, the film collected 1.50 crore and became the highest opening day grosser, beating Ajith Kumar's Vivegam. The film became the biggest opener in Tamil Nadu at that point, grossing 24.8 crore and yielded a share of 14.1 crore to its distributors. It eventually broke the record of Rajinikanth's Kabali which earlier collected 21.5 crore.

Other territories 
The film collected 1.7 crore from the premiere shows held at United States and 2.5 crore the following day, totalling up to 3.08 crore. The film earned A$133,057 (68.01 lakh) from 25 locations, upon its release in Australia and earned £94,311 (₹81.08 lakhs) upon its release in United Kingdom in 37 locations, according to trade analyst Taran Adarsh. The film collected ₹90.31 lakhs from its opening day in Malaysia around 800 theatres.

In its five-day opening weekend, the film collected 140 crore (1.4 billion Indian rupees) worldwide and 170 crore its first week. In 12 days, the film grossed 200 crore worldwide, including 130 crore domestically in India. It has become the highest-grossing film of Vijay's career, and the first of his films to enter the 200 crore club. At the end of its fifth week, the film had reportedly collected 120 crore in Tamil Nadu, 16 crore in Kerala, 13 crore in Karnataka and 15 crore from the rest of India, tallying 164 crore (1.6 billion rupees) domestically and 260 crore (2.6 billion rupees) worldwide. According to The Hans India article published in January 2018, the movie has raked in 244.8 crores by the end of its run.

However, according to the articles by Hindustan Times, Financial Express and India Today, one of the leading distributors, Ramanathan, owner of the Abhirami Mega mall, said that the numbers reported by Mersal are highly inflated and the movie has not raked in  200 crore as reports claim.

Critical response
Mersal received positive reviews from critics. 

M. Suganth, editor-in-chief of The Times of India rated the film three-and-a-half out of five and said, "With Mersal, we have got this year's most engaging mass masala movie. When you have a mass hero in full form like Vijay is in the film, how can things go wrong?". Manoj Kumar R. of The Indian Express also gave three-and-a-half out of five stars stating "Atlee has not just exploited Vijay's stardom to deliver a flamboyant crowd-pleaser (which he did in Theri already) but has fleshed out an interesting script that plays up the best onscreen traits of the actor." 

Sify rated the film three out of five stars and said the film as a "formulaic mass masala action film with a strong social message, whistle worthy moments, eye candy heroines and grand visuals". It further added that the film "relies squarely on the charm of its leading man (Vijay) to pull off its over-the-top tone". Priyanka Sundar of Hindustan Times said that the film "is not about the story, but the way it is delivered; the emotions, sentiment and social message formed the crux of the story", but criticised the length of the second half and the manner in which Samantha's character's arc is resolved. Behindwoods stated there are triple Vijay in the movie and it had created triple positive impact and rated it 2.75 out of five stars.

Baradwaj Rangan of Film Companion South called the film as "gigantic, but deflavoured take of Apoorva Sagotharargal". He added that "the lack of newness is compensated for by rich production values", but praised Vijay's performance saying "Vijay is one actor who seems to be getting younger on screen. He moves beautifully in the dance sequences. He even manages an effective dramatic bit. But he’s let down by the writing". Anupama Subramanian of Deccan Chronicle gave two-and-a-half out of five stars and added "Though the storyline is not new, Atlee cleverly uses the terrific screen presence of Vijay and presents it in an engaging way". Vishal Menon of The Hindu had opined that the film had "references to yesteryear blockbusters; but that could not be determined as dislikeable; it is quite enjoyable". 

Sreedhar Pillai of Firstpost called that "the perfect film for the larger-than-life image of its superstar Vijay, has something in it to satiate viewers with varied tastes", giving a rating of three out of five stars. Indiaglitz gave three out of five stars saying "With his winning formula of old wine in a new bottle, Atlee has proved beyond doubt his caliber as a commercial director and has delivered a sure shot winner". The New Indian Express-based critic Daniel Thimmayya called the film as "ultimate commercial entertainer that rides on Vijay's solid performance and Atlee's slick storytelling".

Srivatsan S of India Today gave three out of five saying "one could say that Mersal is nothing but the rise of a matinee idol". Poornima Murali of News18 called the film "as good in parts: during the evocative flashbacks"; but pointed out a few lame dialogues, logical contradictions and frequent song sequences. Vikram Venkateshwaran of The Quint wrote "It’s got three whole Vijays, with intersecting plot lines, great fight scenes and twelve murders, that will either squeeze your heart, or make you cheer along, all in the name of entertainment". Writing for Manorama Online, Prem Udhayabhanu gave the film three out of five stars saying "The film charms the fans with an elaborate canvas spun for the hero and a social message weaved into it". 

Shyam Goutham, in his review for the magazine The Week wrote "through the film which is packaged with heavy drama and action sequences, Atlee tries to convey a message. For a Vijay fan, there are enough wow moments—slow-motion scenes, 'Ilayathalapathy' saving people and punch dialogues. In fact, a scene showing Vijay talking to the media about the problems in the country has become mandatory". Ananda Vikatan rated the film 43 out of 100.

Controversies 
The film was subjected to several criticisms with the first being, the interim ban issued against the film producers by Madras High Court, for using the title Mersal for promotions. In a lawsuit filed by Rajendran of AR Film Factory, he registered the title Mersalayitten at the Tamil Film Producers Council in 2014, and claimed that the use of the title will affect the business of his film. The high court later dismissed the plea on 6 October 2017. The Tamil Film Producers Council strike from 6–13 October over double taxation row, and the denial of NOC from Animal Welfare Board of India (AWBI) were rumoured to affect the plans release; however, it was resolved later.

Upon release, several notions expressed in the film were opposed by various organisations. The Bharatiya Janata Party (BJP), the ruling political party of Government of India, and the then ruling AIADMK had objected to scenes in which the protagonist, played by Vijay, criticises the recently introduced Goods and Services Tax, and also a scene in which a character ridicules Digital India, an initiative promoted by the Government of India. The ruling BJP demanded that those scenes be cut from the film for future viewership. Several medical associations such as the Tamil Nadu Government Doctors' Association, condemned the film for the alleged cynical portrayal of doctors working in government-operated hospitals. Doctors working with the Indian Medical Association planned to boycott the film and shared links of the film on pirated websites online, in the hope that it would cause monetary losses to the makers of the film. These acts were seen as an attack on freedom of expression by opposing political parties and various other celebrities working in Tamil cinema. Shashi Tharoor condemned BJP's acts against Mersal, similar to infringement of democratic rights.

Though the film was touted to have an approximate collection of 250 crore, the production house Thenandal Studio Limited had to file for bankruptcy due to the high production costs involved. The social media propaganda loss of this film amounts to an approximate 60 crore, with references citing Atlee exceeding the production budget. However, G. Dhananjayan opined that the film was considered profitable to all distributors across Tamil Nadu region, as was, the film's producer Murali Ramaswamy. In November 2018, the Canada-based magician Raman Sharma, who worked in the project accused Thenandal Studios of non-payment of dues and slammed the company for their unprofessional behaviour. In August, Sharma's team sent a legal notice to the makers, demanding the rest of his payment under the Insolvency and Bankruptcy Code, 2016. The financial tussles surrounding over the production house led the makers shelve all of their upcoming projects: notably the company's big-budget film Sangamithra, Dhanush's untitled project with Karthik Subbaraj and his directorial film, A. R. Rahman's virtual reality film Le Musk, and other productions; furthermore, their completed projects Vallavanukkum Vallavan and Iravaakaalam remained unreleased.

Accolades
At the 65th Filmfare Awards South, Mersal received eleven nominations including those for Best Director (Atlee), Best Actor (Vijay) and Best Supporting Actor (S. J. Surya). It won in two categories – Best Supporting Actress (Menen) and Best Music Director (Rahman). At the 10th Vijay Awards, the film received eight nominations and won three awards: Favourite Film, Best Director and Favourite Song. Mersal received twelve nominations at the 7th South Indian International Movie Awards ceremony and won five awards, including Best Director for Atlee, Best Actor in a Negative Role for Surya and Best Music Director for Rahman. Among other wins, the film received ten Techofes Awards, seven Edison Awards, five Ananda Vikatan Cinema Awards and two Norway Tamil Film Festival Awards. At the international ceremonies, the film won one award for Best Foreign Film at the National Film Awards UK. and Best International actor award for Vijay at International Achievement Recognition Award UK.

Impact 
Prior to the film's release, Hollywood stuntman Serge Crozon Cazin, who starred in Ajith Kumar's Vivegam, and S. S. Rajamouli expressed their anticipations on the film, with the latter calling it as "a fantastic film to look forward to". Following the criticism towards the GST and Digital India-scenes levied by BJP, Rajinikanth, Kamal Haasan, Vishal, Vijay Sethupathi, Arvind Swamy and Khushbu Sundar, extended his support towards Mersal and praised Vijay and the team for "bravely addressing social issues in the film". As H. Raja criticised the Censor Board officials over the film's certification after watching the film online, demanding that they should be removed from posts, Gautami Tadimalla, the member of CBFC who watched a screening of the film on 22 October, claimed that "Mersal has been given a fair censor certificate. There was no foul in the film’s dialogues with reference to GST, and asking the scenes to be lifted off the film is a direct threat to freedom of speech." The South Indian Film Chamber of Commerce wrote a letter to Smriti Irani, the Information and Broadcasting minister, seeking action against H. Raja for watching the pirated version of the film online. In a positive note, Mersal emerged as the most tweeted hashtag of 2017 in the entertainment section, according to a survey report by Twitter.

Notes

References

External links 
 
 
 

2017 films
Films set in hospitals
Films scored by A. R. Rahman
2017 masala films
Films shot in Rajasthan
Films shot in Poland
Films shot in Chennai
Films shot in Andhra Pradesh
2010s vigilante films
2017 action thriller films
Films about magic and magicians
Films shot in North Macedonia
Films set in Chennai
Films set in Punjab, India
Films set in Madurai
Films set in Tamil Nadu
Indian nonlinear narrative films
Films set in 1970
Films about surgeons
Fictional portrayals of the Tamil Nadu Police
Films set in Paris
Films shot in Paris
Films about twin brothers
Fictional identical twins
Body swapping in films
Indian action thriller films
Indian vigilante films
Twins in Indian films
Indian pregnancy films
Indian films about revenge
2010s Tamil-language films
Films directed by Atlee (director)